Callosobruchus phaseoli is a species of leaf beetle in the family Chrysomelidae. It is found in North America, Oceania, and South America.

References

Further reading

External links

 

Bruchinae
Articles created by Qbugbot
Beetles described in 1833